Chen Jiaqi (born 2 September 1992), former name Chen Qi, is a Chinese footballer who plays as a forward for Qingdao Hainiu.

Club career

Guangdong
Chen Jiaqi started his professional football career in 2011 when he was promoted to Guangdong Youth's squad for the 2011 China League Two campaign. He joined Chinese Super League side Guangzhou R&F in 2013 and was promoted to the first team by Sven-Göran Eriksson in 2014. Failing to establish himself with the team, he was loaned to Hong Kong Premier League side R&F, which was the satellite team of Guangzhou R&F, in August 2016. He made his debut on 18 September 2016 in the 2016–17 Hong Kong Senior Challenge Shield against BC Glory Sky. His league debut came on 24 September 2016 in a 2–0 away defeat against BC Glory Sky.

Qingdao
On 8 February 2018, Chen transferred to China League Two side Qingdao Jonoon. He would be part of the squad as the club re-branded themselves as Qingdao Hainiu. He would go on to play a vital part as the club won the third tier title and promotion at the end of the 2021 China League Two season. He would go on to achieve successive promotions as he helped guide the club to second in the 2022 China League One season and promotion back into the top tier.

Career statistics 
.

Honours

Club
Qingdao Hainiu
China League Two: 2021

References

External links
CHEN JIAQI at soccerway.com

1992 births
Living people
Chinese footballers
Footballers from Shanghai
Guangzhou City F.C. players
R&F (Hong Kong) players
Qingdao Hainiu F.C. (1990) players
Association football forwards
Chinese Super League players
Hong Kong Premier League players